Stoenești is a commune located in Vâlcea County, Oltenia, Romania. It is composed of thirteen villages: Bârlogu, Budurăști, Deleni, Dobriceni, Gruieri, Gruiu, Mogoșești, Neghinești, Piscu Mare (until 1964 Cacova), Popești, Stoenești, Suseni and Zmeurătu.

References

Communes in Vâlcea County
Localities in Oltenia